Sudhanshu Mittal is an Indian politician affiliated to the Bharatiya Janata Party (BJP). He was in the 1979 batch of the St. Xavier's School, Delhi. He completed his B. Com. from the Shri Ram College Of Commerce (1982 batch) and was President of the Delhi University Students Union in 1981-82. Later, he took admission in the law college but dropped to support a family business.

Mittal is a member and official spokesperson of BJP.

He was a confidant of Pramod Mahajan, a senior BJP leader who died in 2006. Although described as a top contender for the party's Chandni Chowk parliament seat, Mittal was not selected to contest it in the 2014 general elections.

He is a keen sportsman who excels in Badminton. He is a reputed sports administrator. Besides being Vice President of the India Olympic Association, he is also the President of Kho Kho Federation of India. He is credited with making Kho Kho an international game.

References

External links

People from Delhi
Bharatiya Janata Party politicians from Delhi
Delhi University alumni
Shri Ram College of Commerce alumni
Date of birth missing (living people)
Living people
Presidents of Delhi University Students Union
Indian sports executives and administrators
1959 births